Zverino Island is the largest and westernmost island in the Meade group lying in the north entrance to McFarlane Strait in the South Shetland Islands, Antarctica.

The island is named after the settlement of Zverino in Western Bulgaria.

Location
British mapping in 1935 and 1968, Chilean in 1971, Argentine in 1980, Spanish in 1991, and Bulgarian in 2005 and 2009.

Maps
 L.L. Ivanov et al. Antarctica: Livingston Island and Greenwich Island, South Shetland Islands. Scale 1:100000 topographic map. Sofia: Antarctic Place-names Commission of Bulgaria, 2005.
 L.L. Ivanov. Antarctica: Livingston Island and Greenwich, Robert, Snow and Smith Islands. Scale 1:120000 topographic map. Troyan: Manfred Wörner Foundation, 2010.  (First edition 2009. )
 Antarctic Digital Database (ADD). Scale 1:250000 topographic map of Antarctica. Scientific Committee on Antarctic Research (SCAR). Since 1993, regularly upgraded and updated.
 L.L. Ivanov. Antarctica: Livingston Island and Smith Island. Scale 1:100000 topographic map. Manfred Wörner Foundation, 2017.

See also
List of Antarctic and subantarctic islands

Notes

References
 Zverino Island. SCAR Composite Antarctic Gazetteer.
 Bulgarian Antarctic Gazetteer. Antarctic Place-names Commission. (details in Bulgarian, basic data in English)

External links
 Zverino Island. Copernix satellite image

Islands of the South Shetland Islands
Bulgaria and the Antarctic